Geomancy is a method of divination that interprets markings on the ground or the patterns formed by tossed handfuls of soil, rocks, or sand. The most prevalent form of divinatory geomancy involves interpreting a series of 16 figures formed by a randomized process that involves recursion, followed by analyzing them, often augmented with astrological interpretations.

Geomancy was practiced by people from all social classes. It was one of the most popular forms of divination throughout Africa and Europe, particularly during the Middle Ages and the Renaissance, although in Renaissance magic, geomancy was classified as one of the seven "forbidden arts", along with necromancy, hydromancy, aeromancy, pyromancy, chiromancy (palmistry), and scapulimancy.

History

The word "geomancy", from Late Greek *γεωμαντεία *geōmanteía "earth divination", translates literally to "earth divination"; it is a calque translation of the Arabic term ‛ilm al-raml, or the "science of the sand".  Earlier Greek renditions of this word borrowed the Arabic word raml ("sand") directly, rendering it as rhamplion or rabolion.  Other Arabic names for geomancy include khatt al-raml and darb al-raml.

The original names of the figures in Middle Eastern geomancy were traditionally given in Arabic, excluding a Persian origin. The reference in Hermetic texts to the mythical Ṭumṭum al-Hindi potentially points to an Indian origin, although Stephen Skinner thinks this unlikely. Having an Islamic or Arabic origin is most likely, since the expansive trade-routes of Arabian merchants would facilitate the exchange of culture and knowledge.

European scholars and universities began to translate Arabic texts and treatises in the early Middle Ages, including those on geomancy. Isidore of Seville ( 560 –   636) lists geomancy with other methods of divination – including pyromancy, hydromancy, aeromancy, and necromancy – without describing its application or methods. It could be that Isidore of Seville was listing methods of elemental scrying more than what is commonly known as geomancy. The poem Experimentarius attributed to Bernardus Silvestris, who wrote in the middle of the 12th century, was a verse translation of a work on astrological geomancy.  One of the first discourses on geomancy translated into Latin was the Ars Geomantiae of Hugh of Santalla ( early 12th century). By this point, geomancy must have been an established divination system in Arabic-speaking areas of Africa and the Middle East.

Other translators, such as Gerard of Cremona ( 1114 – 1187), also produced new translations on geomancy that incorporated astrological elements and techniques that were, up until this point, ignored. From this point on, more European scholars studied and applied geomancy, writing many treatises in the process. Henry Cornelius Agrippa (1486–1535), Christopher Cattan (La Géomancie du Seigneur Christofe de Cattan (1558)), and John Heydon (1629 –  1667) produced oft-cited and well-studied treatises on geomancy, along with other philosophers, occultists, and theologians until the 17th century, when interest in occultism and divination began to dwindle due to the rise of the Scientific Revolution and the Age of Reason.

Geomancy underwent a revival in the 19th century, when renewed interest in the occult arose due to the works of Robert Thomas Cross (1850–1923) and of Edward Bulwer-Lytton (1803–1873). Franz Hartmann published his text, The Principles of Astrological Geomancy,
(English translation: 1889) which spurred new interest in the divination system. Based on this and a few older texts, the Hermetic Order of the Golden Dawn (founded in 1887) began the task of recollecting knowledge on geomancy along with other occult subjects, with them, Aleister Crowley (1875–1947) published his works that integrated various occult systems of knowledge.  However, due to the short time the members of the Golden Dawn desired to learn, practice, and teach the old occult arts, many elaborate systems of divination and ritual had to be compressed, losing much in the process.  In effect, they had reduced geomancy from a complex art of interpretation and skill in recognizing patterns to looking up predefined answers based on pairs of figures.

Like other systems of divination, geomancy has mythological associations.  According to one Arabic Hermetic text, Idris (or Hermes Trismegistus) witnessed the angel Jibril in a dream.  Idris asked for enlightenment, and Jibril proceeded to draw a geomantic figure. Upon being asked what he was doing, Jibril instructed Idris in the geomantic arts.  Keeping this secret, he sought out Ṭumṭum al-Hindi, an Indian king, who then wrote a book on geomancy.  This book was passed down through clandestine circles into the hands of Khalaf al-Barbarĩ, who traveled to Medina and was converted to Islam by the prophet Muhammad himself.  Confessing to knowing a divinatory art, he explained that pre-Islamic prophets knew geomancy, and that by learning geomancy, one may "know all that the prophet knew".

Another mythological story for the origin of geomancy also involves Idris.<ref>Maupoil, Bernard.  "Contribution à létude de l'origine musulmane de la géomancie dans le Bas-Dahomey." Journal de la sociéte des africanistes", volume 13, pp. 17–8.</ref>  After praying to God that He give Idris easily a means to earn his living, Idris rested one day, bored and without work, and began to draw figures idly in the sand.  As he did so, a stranger appeared before him and questioned what he was doing.  Idris replied that he was simply entertaining himself, but the stranger replied that he was doing a very serious act.  Idris became incredulous and tried to deny this, but the stranger explained the significance of the meaning of the figure Idris drew.  He then commanded Idris to draw another figure, and upon doing so the stranger explained the meaning and significance of that figure.

The pair continued this until Idris had discovered and understood the sixteen figures.  The stranger then taught Idris how to form the figures in a regular manner and what the results meant, teaching him how to know things that could not be known with just the physical senses.  After testing Idris' newfound knowledge and skill of geomancy, and revealing himself to be the angel Jibril in the process, the stranger disappeared.  Idris, thankful to God and His messenger that he had learned this art, never revealed the art to anyone. Before he was risen to God, he wrote a book describing the art as Jibril had taught him, and from his successors.

Other tablets and records from antiquity identify Idris with the prophets Daniel or with Enoch.  This was done in order to give geomancy a legitimate standing as a gift and skill from God, especially since one of the prophets had practiced it.  However, those who argued against geomancy, such as Ibn Khaldun in his Muqaddima (1377), countered that it was a pre-Islamic system of knowledge, and that all such epistemologies were rendered obsolete with the revelation of the Qur'an.

Throughout the evolution and migration of geomancy, various tales and plays incorporated aspects of the art into their stories.  In one story in One Thousand and One Nights, both the African Magician and his brother use geomancy to find Aladdin in order to do him harm. Geomancy's first mention in print came in William Langland's Piers Plowman where it is unfavorably compared to the level of expertise a person needs for astronomy ("gemensye [geomesye] is gynful of speche"). In 1386 Chaucer used the "Parson's Tale" to poke fun at geomancy in Canterbury Tales: "What say we of them that believe in divynailes as …geomancie…". Shakespeare and Ben Jonson were also known to use geomancy for comic relief. Dante Alighieri's Divine Comedy (early 14th century) makes a passing reference to geomancy.  In the first two stanzas of Canto XIX in the Purgatorio,

Generating the geomantic charts

Geomancy requires the geomancer to create sixteen lines of points or marks without counting, creating sixteen random numbers. Without taking note of the number of points made, the geomancer provides the seemingly random mechanism needed for most forms of divination. Once the lines are produced, the geomancer marks off the points two by two until either one or two points remain in the line; mathematically, this is the same as producing two dots if the number is even or one dot if the number is odd. Taking these leftover points in groups of four, they form the first four geomantic figures, and form the basis for the generation of the remaining figures. Once this is done, the "inspired" portion of the geomantic reading is done; what remains is algorithmic calculation.

Traditionally, geomancy requires a surface of sand and the hands or a stick, but can be done equally well with a wax tablet and stylus or a pen and paper; ritualized objects may or may not be desired for use in divination. Often, when drawing marks or figures, geomancers will proceed from right to left as a tradition from geomancy's Arabic origins, although this is by no means mandatory.  Modern methods of geomancy include, in addition to the traditional ways, computerized random number generators or thrown objects; other methods including counting the eyes on potatoes. Some practitioners use specialized cards, with each card representing a single geomantic figure; in this case, only four cards are drawn after shuffling. Specialized machines have also been used to generate full geomantic charts.

The figures are entered into a specialized table, known as the shield chart, which illustrates the recursive processes reminiscent of the Cantor set that form the figures. The first four figures are called the matres, or Mothers, and form the basis for the rest of the figures in the chart; they occupy the first four houses in the upper right-hand corner such that the first Mother is to the far right, the second Mother is to her left, and so on (continuing the right-to-left tradition).

The next four figures, the filiae, or Daughters, are formed by rearranging the lines used in the Mothers: the first Daughter is formed by taking the first line from the first, second, third, and fourth Mothers in order and rearranging them to be the first Daughter's first, second, third, and fourth lines, respectively. The process is done similarly for the second Daughter using the second line from the Mothers, and so on. The Daughters are placed in the next four houses in order on the same row as the Mothers.

After the eight matres and filiae are formed, the four nepotes (or Nieces) are formed by adding those pairs of figures that rest above the houses of the respective Niece.  Therefore, the first and second Mothers add to form the first Niece, the third and fourth Mothers add to form the second Niece, and so on. Here, addition involves summing the points in the respective lines of the parents: if the sum is an even number, then the resulting figure's line will have two points, and if the sum is odd then the line will have one point.  Conceptually, this is the same procedure in mathematical logic as the exclusive or, where a line with two points is used instead of "false" and a line with one point instead of "true".

From the four nepotes, the two testes (or Witnesses) are formed in the same manner as the nepotes: the first and second Nieces form the Right Witness, and the third and fourth Nieces form the Left Witness. From the Witnesses, using the same addition process, the iudex, or Judge, is formed. A sixteenth figure, the Reconciler or superiudex, is also generated by adding the Judge and the First Mother, although this has become seen as extraneous and a "backup figure" in recent times.

Interpreting the charts

The shield chart most likely provided an early visual guide to generating the figures, and the interpreted answer would center on the fifteenth and sixteenth figures, the Judge and Reconciler.  Skilled geomancers observe the whole chart, interpreting (among other things) meanings of the figures based on where they place in the chart, the numerical significance of the total points, and the similarities produced by added figures.  Generally, the Judge represents the answer to the question, the Right Witness describes the querent's side of the query, the Left Witness represents the quesited's side, and the Reconciler represents the effect of the outcome (or Judge) upon the querent.  The skilled geomancer can deduce root causes to the situation, hidden influences, the outcome and its aftermath, and general trends and events in the querent's life through interpreting the chart.

One division of the shield chart for interpretation involves triplets of the figures called triplicities.  Each triplicity contains two of the Mothers or two of the Daughters and the Niece that results from them.  They can be interpreted in a manner similar to the Witnesses and Judge, in that the right parent represents the past, the child the present, and the left parent the future; another way to interpret such a triplet views the right parent as the querent's side, allies, resources, and opinions, the left parent as the quesited's side, and the child as the interaction of the two sides.

Another method of evaluating a geomantic chart involves taking the total sum of all points from 16 figures within the shield chart.  In order to evaluate how quickly the queried situation would resolve, Pietro d'Abano suggested that the total sum be compared to the sum of all points in the sixteen geomantic figures, which is 96.  If the sum of the chart is 96, then the resolution of the query will be "swift, and neither slow nor doubtful;" in other words, that all things that could be acted upon in the situation described by the query would resolve without delay nor ahead of schedule.  If the sum is less than 96, then it will resolve quickly, and in a degree proportional to the difference between 96 and the total.  Conversely, if the sum is more than 96, then it will resolve slowly.

European geomancers provided an alternate method of interpreting the figures through the house chart, which feature the twelve astrological houses.  Here, they assign the figures from the shield chart to the houses in the house chart; the order used differs between different circles of occultists.  While European geomancers still used the shield chart to generate the figures and provide most answers, they augmented geomancy with astrological techniques in the house chart.  Based upon the query, they could provide a deeper insight into the querent's life, factors shaping the query itself, and the extent of the situations involved.  They took note when several houses shared the same figure; as this figure passes from one house to the next, it generally indicates that the same situation or event affects each of those houses.

Pietro d'Abano discusses the primary modes of perfection used in geomantic interpretations with significators in his geomancy essay.  In astrological geomancy, the significators are chosen based upon the identity of the querent and the identity of the quesited. Generally, except when the querent asks about a situation about a subject with no immediate connection to themselves, the querent's significator is located in the first house (see Derivative house).

The quesited's significator is identified based upon the focus of the query: this is based upon the relation of the query to the astrological houses.  Some questions require more than two significators, such as in a query involving several primary factors (e.g., two parties quarrelling over an estate).  Queries that have a yes-or-no, or possible-impossible, answer can easily be answered with these modes of perfection. If the chart perfects, the answer is "yes". Otherwise, in the case of denial of perfection, "no".

The nature of the figures themselves should also be considered. If a chart perfects with negative figures, for instance, the matter will resolve but the querent may not like the result.  On the other hand, if the chart does not perfect but the figures are good, then the matter will not resolve even though the querent can make do successfully without it.

In addition to modes of perfection, geomancers often took note of aspects between those figures that passed to other houses, and especially ones that made aspects to the significators.  Often, when a chart denied perfection, geomancers would observe how the significators aspected each other; the aspects here retain similar meanings from astrology.

Christopher Cattan advocates using the strength of the astrological houses in determining the resolution.  By observing the nature of the figures (good or ill, depending on the query) and what type of house they fall in (angular, succedent, or cadent), he judges the total effect of the figures on the query.  The figures that fall in cadent houses have little to no effect, those that fall in succedent houses have a transient effect, and those that fall in angular houses have the strongest and most lasting effect upon the query.

Other examples of astrological technique used in geomancy include assigning zodiacal rulerships to the geomantic figures, linking geomantic figures to parts of the body based on zodiacal rulers, and assigning planetary spirits, intelligences, and genii to the figures based on their ruling planets.

Geomancy and mathematics
The four binary elements of each figure allow for 16 different combinations, each called a tableau. As each chart is generated from the four Mothers, there are a total number of 164, or 65,536, possible charts.  Due to the mathematics of the chart, only figures that have an even number of points total can become Judges; each of the eight Judges then has 8,192 charts associated with it.  Traditional practitioners of geomancy use this knowledge as a type of parity check on the chart to ensure that no mistakes have been made while computing the figures.

In each chart, if all sixteen figures are observed (the four Mothers, the four Daughters, the four Nieces, the Witnesses, Judge, and Reconciler), at least two of the figures must be the same.  As the Reconciler is usually termed an optional figure, 16 combinations of Mother figures can yield a chart where the Mothers, Daughters, Nieces, Witnesses, and Judge are all unique.

Populus cannot appear in these charts, since mathematically it either requires two figures to be the same in order to be formed, or produces a duplicate figure when added to another figure.  In such charts, the Judge will always be one of Conjunctio, Amissio, Carcer, or Acquisitio.  The sixteen combinations of Mothers, in order from the First to the Fourth Mother, are
 Puer, Caput Draconis, Tristitia, Albus
 Conjunctio, Puella, Fortuna Major, Tristitia
 Puella, Puer, Tristitia, Albus
 Puella, Cauda Draconis, Tristitia, Albus
 Rubeus, Laetitia, Puella, Puer
 Rubeus, Laetitia, Cauda Draconis, Puella
 Rubeus, Laetitia, Cauda Draconis, Caput Draconis
 Rubeus, Laetitia, Caput Draconis, Puer
 Acquisitio, Puella, Albus, Fortuna Major
 Laetitia, Fortuna Minor, Puer, Conjunctio
 Laetitia, Fortuna Minor, Acquisitio, Cauda Draconis
 Cauda Draconis, Caput Draconis, Tristitia, Albus
 Caput Draconis, Amissio, Fortuna Major, Tristitia
 Caput Draconis, Carcer, Albus, Fortuna Major
 Fortuna Minor, Rubeus, Puer, Amissio
 Fortuna Minor, Rubeus, Carcer, Cauda Draconis

Other forms of geomancy
The Arabic tradition consists of sketching sixteen random lines of dots in sand.  This same process survived virtually unchanged through its introduction to Europe in the medieval era, and survives to this day in various Arabic countries. Sikidy and other forms of African divination also follow techniques that have remained virtually unchanged.

In Africa one traditional form of geomancy consists of throwing handfuls of dirt in the air and observing how the dirt falls. It can also involve a mouse as the agent of the earth spirit. Ifá, one of the oldest forms of geomancy, originated in West Africa, and uses the same sixteen geomantic figures as in Arabic and Western geomancy with different meanings and names; the process is shortened to using only two figures. In China, the diviner may enter a trance and make markings on the ground that are interpreted by an associate (often a young or illiterate boy).  Similar forms of geomancy include scrying involving the patterns seen in rocks or soil.

The Chinese divination practice of the I Ching has several striking similarities to geomancy.  It includes a series of binary trigrams (as opposed to tetragrams used in geomancy) that are generated at random, the resulting figures of which are taken in combination.  However, the figures are not added or reorganized as in geomancy, but are instead taken to form a single hexagram.  While there are 23, or eight, trigrams, there are 26, or 64, hexagrams.  This yields a smaller set of resulting charts than geomancy.

Vastu shastra is a traditional Indian system of architecture which literally translates to "science of architecture." These are texts found on the Indian subcontinent that describe principles of design, layout, measurements, ground preparation, space arrangement, and spatial geometry.Acharya P.K. (1946), An Encyclopedia of Hindu Architecture, Oxford University Press Vastu Shastras incorporate traditional Hindu and in some cases Buddhist beliefs. The designs are intended to integrate architecture with nature, the relative functions of various parts of the structure, and ancient beliefs utilizing geometric patterns (yantra), symmetry, and directional alignments.

Vastu Shastra are the textual part of Vastu Vidya, the latter being the broader knowledge about architecture and design theories from ancient India. Vastu Vidya knowledge is a collection of ideas and concepts, with or without the support of layout diagrams, that are not rigid. Rather, these ideas and concepts are models for the organization of space and form within a building or collection of buildings, based on their functions in relation to each other, their usage and to the overall fabric of the Vastu. Ancient Vastu Shastra principles include those for the design of Mandir (Hindu temples), and the principles for the design and layout of houses, towns, cities, gardens, roads, water works, shops and other public areas.GD Vasudev (2001), Vastu, Motilal Banarsidas, pp 74–92

Kumalak is a type of geomancy practiced in Kazakhstan, Tuva, and other parts of Central Asia. Kumalak makes use of a three by three grid, wherein a shaman will ritually place up to 41 beads.  These shamans use kumalak more to connect with their ancestors and spiritual guides than to obtain information through divination.  Further, shamans who use kumalak must be initiated and taught how to perform the rituals of kumalak correctly.  According to them, kumalak is an ancient system of knowledge reaching back to the roots of their civilization.

In Korea, this tradition was popularized in the ninth century by the Buddhist monk Toson(Doseon).  In Korea, geomancy takes the form of interpreting the topography of the land to determine future events and or the strength of a dynasty or particular family.  Therefore, not only were location and land forms important, but the topography could shift causing disfavor and the need to relocate.  The idea is still accepted in many South East Asian societies today, although with reduced force.

In the 19th century, Christian missionaries in China translated feng shui as "geomancy" due to their observations of local shamans and priests manipulating the flow and direction of energy based on aesthetics, location, and position of objects and buildings.  Although it stems from a distinct tradition, the term "geomancy" now commonly includes feng shui.  Similarly, the introduction of a similar Indian system of aesthetics and positioning to harmonize the local energies, vastu shastra, has come under the name "geomancy".  Due to the definition having changed over time (along with the recognized definition of the suffix -mancy''), "geomancy" can cover any spiritual, metaphysical, or pseudoscientific practice that is related to the Earth.  In recent times the term has been applied to a wide range of other occult and fringe activities, including Earth mysteries and the introduction of ley lines and Bau-Biologie.

In fantasy literature
In some fantasy literature, especially that which deals with the four classic Greek elements (air, water, fire, earth), geomancy refers to magic that controls earth (and sometimes metal and crystals).

See also
Dowsing
Feng shui
Geomantic figures
Ley line
Tiang Seri
Quackery

References

External links

 Medieval Geomancy, Elizabeth Bennet's web site
 Collegium Geomanticum, John Michael Greer's web site
 Ron Eglash's web site (Ethnomathematician)
 Wim van Binsbergen's web site (African studies professor)
 Astrological Geomancy at Renaissance Astrology
 Astrogem Astrological Geomancy
 A Potted History of Geomancy, article by Richard Creightmore

 
Divination
History of astrology